Merrifieldia particiliata is a moth of the family Pterophoridae that is endemic to the Canary Islands.

The head, thorax, forewings and hindwings are brownish ochreous.

References

Moths described in 1908
particiliata
Endemic fauna of the Canary Islands
Insects of the Canary Islands
Moths of Africa